Roger Pryor (August 27, 1901 – January 31, 1974) was an American film actor.

Early years
The son of bandmaster Arthur Pryor, Roger Pryor was born in New York City, New York. He had a brother, Arthur Pryor Jr., who was also a bandmaster. Pryor attended the Dwight School in New York. While there, he became so interested in performing on stage that "he and the school parted company by mutual consent."

Stage
Pryor's debut on stage came in stock theater when he was 18, after which he worked with several repertory theatre companies. His Broadway credits include The Backslapper (1925), The Sea Woman (1925), Paid (1925), Saturday's Children (1927), The Royal Family (1927), See Naples and Die (1929), Apron Strings (1930), Up Pops the Devil (1930), A Modern Virgin (1931), Here Goes the Bride (1931), Blessed Event (1932), There's Always Juliet (1932),  and Message for Margaret (1947).

Film

Pryor often had leading roles in B movies in the 1930s and 1940s. He appeared in more than 50 films between 1930 and 1945, including the A picture Belle of the Nineties with Mae West.

Radio
Pryor was host of "a number of prestigious network programs," including The United States Steel Hour, The Pause That Refreshes,, The Coca-Cola Summer Show and The Screen Guild Theater. He starred as Dan McGarry in McGarry and His Mouse and was the producer of Cavalcade of America. He also had his own music program, featuring the Roger Pryor Orchestra.

Advertising agency
In 1947, Pryor changed careers, becoming vice president in charge of broadcasting at Foote, Cone and Belding advertising agency.

Family and death
Pryor was married to Priscilla Mitchell, the daughter of vaudeville star Bessie Clayton; they had one daughter before divorcing in 1933. He married, secondly, in 1936, actress Ann Sothern; they divorced in 1942.

Pryor died January 31, 1974, in Puerto Vallarta, Mexico.

Selected filmography

 Moonlight and Pretzels (1933) as George Dwight
 I Like It That Way (1934) as Jack Anderson
 I'll Tell the World (1934) as William S. Briggs
 Romance in the Rain (1934) as Charles Denton
 Gift of Gab (1934) as Kelly
 Belle of the Nineties (1934) as Tiger Kid
 Wake Up and Dream (1934) as Charles Sullivan
 Lady by Choice (1934) as Johnny Mills
 Strange Wives (1934) as Jimmy King
 Straight from the Heart (1935) as Andy MacLean
 One Frightened Night (1935) as Masked Killer (uncredited)
 Dinky (1935) as Tom Marsden
 The Headline Woman (1935) as Bob Grayson
 The Girl Friend (1935) as George Thorne
 The Case of the Missing Man (1935) as Jimmy Hudson
 1,000 Dollars a Minute (1935) as Wally Jones
 To Beat the Band (1935) as Larry Barry
 The Return of Jimmy Valentine (1936) as Gary Howard
 Ticket to Paradise (1936) as Terry Dodd aka Jack Doe
 Missing Girls (1936) as Jimmie Dugan
 Sitting on the Moon (1936) as Danny West
 The Man They Could Not Hang (1939) as District Attorney Drake
 Sued for Libel (1939) as District Attorney Willard Corbin
 The Man with Nine Lives (1940) as Dr. Tim Mason
 The Lone Wolf Meets a Lady (1940) as Pete Rennick
 A Fugitive from Justice (1940) as Dan Miller
 Gambling on the High Seas (1940) as Max Gates
 Money and the Woman (1940) as Charles Patterson
 Glamour for Sale (1940) as Jim Daly
 She Couldn't Say No (1940) as Wallace Turnbull
 Bowery Boy (1940) as J. R. Mason
 South of Panama (1941) as Mike Lawrence
 Power Dive (1941) as Daniel McMasters
 Bullets for O'Hara (1941) as Mike O'Hara
 Gambling Daughters (1941) as Chance Landon
 The Richest Man in Town (1941) as Tom Manning
 Flying Blind (1941) as Rocky Drake
 The Officer and the Lady (1941) as Johnny Davis
 So's Your Aunt Emma (1942) as Terry Connors
 I Live on Danger (1942) as Bert Jannings
 Smart Alecks (1942) as Joe Reagan
 A Man's World (1942) as Bugsy Nelson
 Lady Bodyguard (1943) as George MacAlister
 Submarine Alert (1943) as G. B. Fleming
 Thoroughbreds (1944) as Harold Matthews
 The Kid Sister (1945) as Waldo Barnes
 The Cisco Kid Returns (1945) as John Harris
 High Powered (1945) as Rod Farrell
 Identity Unknown (1945) Rocks Donally
 Scared Stiff (1945) as Richardson
 The Man from Oklahoma (1945) as Jim Gardner (final film role)

References

External links

 
 

1901 births
1974 deaths
20th-century American male actors
American male film actors
Male actors from New York City